Scirpophaga auristrigellus is a moth in the family Crambidae. It was described by George Hampson in 1896. It is found in Guangxi, China, India and Bhutan.

The wingspan is 20–26 mm. The forewings are pale yellow, but yellow between the veins.

References

Moths described in 1896
Schoenobiinae
Moths of Asia